Type III site-specific deoxyribonuclease (type III restriction enzyme, restriction-modification system) is an enzyme. This enzyme catalyses the following chemical reaction

 Endonucleolytic cleavage of DNA to give specific double-stranded fragments with terminal 5'-phosphates

This group of enzymes has an absolute requirement for ATP, but does not hydrolyse it.

See also 
 Restriction enzyme

References

External links 
 

EC 3.1.21